Kurt Sommerlatt (25 December 1928 – 8 February 2019) was a German footballer and manager. He was born in Karlsruhe and died there in 2019.

Career 
Sommerlatt played for VfB Mühlburg, Karlsruher SC, Bayern Munich and FC La Chaux-de-Fonds. He also competed in the 1952 Summer Olympics.

References

External links
 
 
 

1928 births
2019 deaths
Footballers from Karlsruhe
German footballers
Association football midfielders
Karlsruher SC players
FC Bayern Munich footballers
FC La Chaux-de-Fonds players
Olympic footballers of Germany
Footballers at the 1952 Summer Olympics
German football managers
Bundesliga managers
FC La Chaux-de-Fonds managers
Karlsruher SC managers
FK Pirmasens managers
Borussia Neunkirchen managers
FC 08 Homburg managers
SpVgg Ludwigsburg managers
West German expatriate footballers
West German expatriate football managers
German expatriate sportspeople in Switzerland
Expatriate footballers in Switzerland
Expatriate football managers in Switzerland
West German footballers
West German football managers